John Holloway Sanders FRIBA (1825 – 16 October 1884) was an architect based in England and chief architect of the Midland Railway until 1884.

His date of appointment as Chief Architect to the Midland Railway is not known, but he is recorded as working for them in 1845. He is particularly noted for his station buildings on the Settle to Carlisle railway which were all built in a similar style, they became known colloquially as Midland Gothic or Derby Gothic.

He was appointed Fellow of the Royal Institute of British Architects on 22 April 1872.

On his death in 1884, the position of Chief Architect of the Midland Railway went to Charles Trubshaw.

List of works

References

19th-century English architects
1825 births
1884 deaths
British railway architects
Fellows of the Royal Institute of British Architects